Chadderton Football Club is a football club in based in Chadderton, Oldham, Greater Manchester.

History
The club was established in 1946 as Burnley Lane Estate Juniors and initially played in the  Middleton Youth League. The following year the club moved to Mill Brow, started an adult team and were renamed Millbrow Football Club. After moving again the club was renamed North Chadderton Amateurs. At the time, the club played in the Oldham Amateur League, winning its Challenge Cup in 1954–55. They moved up to the Manchester Amateur League, winning the North division in 1955–56 and adopting their current name in 1957.

At the end of the 1958–59 season, Chadderton were promoted to Division One. They were Division One champions in 1962–63, and also started playing in Division Two of the Manchester League. They were runners-up in Division Two in both 1962–63 and 1963–64, before winning the division in 1964–65. However, they were not promoted. The division was renamed Division One in 1966 and Chadderton were champions again in 1966–67, after which they were promoted to the Premier Division.

In 1980 the club moved up to the Lancashire Combination. When the league merged with the Cheshire County League in 1982 to form the North West Counties League, Chadderton were founder members of Division Two. A third-place finish in 1988–89 saw them promoted to Division One. However, they finished bottom of Division One the following season and were relegated back to Division Two. Despite only finishing eleventh in 1991–92, the club were promoted to Division One again. They played in Division One until being demoted at the end of the 1997–98 season due to failing ground grading requirements. Division Two was renamed Division One in 2008.

A sixth-place finish in 2014–15 season saw them qualify for the promotion play-offs. However, they lost 2–1 to AFC Darwen in the semi-finals.

Ground
The club initially played at Parkway when they were known as Burnley Lane Estate Juniors, before moving to Mill Brow the following year. In Mill Brow they played on a pitch next to the canal in Mills Hill. The nearby Rose of Lancaster pub was used as a changing room. They later moved to a ground on the Broadway road.

Honours
Manchester League
Division One champions 1966–67
Division Two champions 1964–65
Murray Shield Winners 1964–65
Gilgryst Cup winners 1969–70
Manchester Amateur League
Division One champions 1962–63
North division champions 1955–56
Oldham Amateur League
Challenge Cup winners 1954–55
Manchester Challenge Trophy
Winners 1971–72

Records
Best FA Cup performance: Second qualifying round, 1987–88, 1988–89, 1992–93, 1994–95
Best FA Vase performance: Fourth round, 2014–15
Record attendance: 2,352 vs FC United of Manchester, 2006

See also
Chadderton F.C. players

References

External links

Football clubs in England
Sport in the Metropolitan Borough of Oldham
Association football clubs established in 1946
1946 establishments in England
Chadderton
Manchester Football League
Lancashire Combination
North West Counties Football League clubs